Sean Hedges-Quinn is a British sculptor, animator,  and film model and prop-maker.

Life
Hedges-Quinn was born in Ipswich in April 1968. After graduating from the University of Hertfordshire, Hedges-Quinn worked in the film industry as a model-maker, prop-master and sculptor. His first role was as a prop-maker on The Borrowers in 1996 before he was taken on by Jim Henson's creature shop in London.  He has worked for films such as the 1997 version of Lost in Space, Reign of Fire, The Hours, V for Vendetta, The Phantom of the Opera, 12 Monkeys and as senior prosthetic technician on Clash of the Titans. 
He has been commissioned to produce statues for several notable footballers including Bobby Robson, Alf Ramsey, Ted Bates, Bob Stokoe, Nat Lofthouse and Kevin Beattie. He has also created statues of Dad's Army's Captain Mainwaring and in 2018, a statue of the suffragette Alice Hawkins which was unveiled in Leicester.

Personal life
Hedges-Quinn works from a studio in Great Bricett near Ipswich, Suffolk.

References

External links

Living people
British sculptors
British male sculptors
Alumni of the University of Hertfordshire
The Jim Henson Company people
Special effects people
Artists from Ipswich
Modern sculptors
Year of birth missing (living people)